Freibach is a river of Thuringia, Germany. At its confluence with the Taubach and the Lengwitz near Stützerbach, the Ilm is formed.

See also
List of rivers of Thuringia

Rivers of Thuringia
Rivers of Germany